The 1981 SEC men's basketball tournament took place from March 4–7, 1981 at the Birmingham-Jefferson Convention Complex in Birmingham, Alabama. The Ole Miss Rebels, who represents the University of Mississippi won their first SEC tournament title in the championship game by defeating the Georgia Bulldogs by a score of 66–62. Ole Miss also received the SEC’s automatic bid to the 1981 NCAA Men’s Division I Basketball Tournament. Television coverage was regionally syndicated by the now-defunct TVS Television Network.

Bracket

References

 

SEC men's basketball tournament
1980–81 Southeastern Conference men's basketball season
1981 in sports in Alabama
Basketball competitions in Birmingham, Alabama
College basketball tournaments in Alabama